John Dillon (14 September 1943 – 23 June 2019) was an Irish hurler who played for Tipperary Senior Championship club Roscrea. He played for the Tipperary senior hurling team for one season, during which time he usually lined out as a right corner-back.     

Dillon began his hurling career at club level with Roscrea. After enjoying much success in the minor and under-21 grades, he eventually broke onto the club's senior team. He enjoyed his first success at senior level when the club won the North Tipperary Championship in 1968. Dillon later captained Roscrea to the 1968 Tipperary Senior Championship title before winning a second title in 1969.

At inter-county level, Dillon was part of the Tipperary minor team that lost back-to-back All-Ireland finals in 1960 and 1961 before later winning an All-Ireland Championship with the under-21 team in 1964. He joined the Tipperary senior team in 1964. Dillon was a substitute on Tipperary's All-Ireland Championship-winning team in 1965. He also secured Munster Championship and National Hurling League medals that season.

Honours

Roscrea
Tipperary Senior Hurling Championship (2): 1968 (c), 1969
North Tipperary Senior Hurling Championship (4): 1963, 1967, 1968, 1969
Tipperary Under-21 Hurling Championship (2): 1963, 1964
Tipperary Minor Hurling Championship (3): 1959, 1960, 1961

Tipperary
All-Ireland Senior Hurling Championship (1): 1965
Munster Senior Hurling Championship (7): 1965
National Hurling League (1): 1964-65
All-Ireland Under-21 Hurling Championship (1): 1965
Munster Under-21 Hurling Championship (1): 1965
Munster Minor Hurling Championship (2): 1960, 1961

References

1943 births
2019 deaths
Roscrea hurlers
Tipperary inter-county hurlers